Shelley Moore or Shelly Moore may be:
Shelley Moore, 1932-2016, English-American singer
Shelley Moore Capito, born 1953, United States Senator from West Virginia
Shelley Moore (educator), Canadian educator
Shelly Moore, born 1978, American beauty queen